Ray Harroun (January 12, 1879 – January 19, 1968) was an American racecar driver and pioneering constructor most famous for winning the inaugural Indianapolis 500 in 1911. He is the inventor of the open-wheel car.

Biography
He was born on January 12, 1879, in Spartansburg, Pennsylvania to Russell LaFayette Harroun and Lucy A. Halliday. His father was a carpenter. Ray was their youngest child.

He participated in the original setting of the land speed record driving from Chicago to New York in 1903, and the re-taking of that record in 1904.  He and four others drove in shifts non-stop to establish the record of 76 hours at the end of September, 1903.  That time was bested by another team nearly a year later, and in October 1904, the Columbia team re-set the record at 58 hrs, 35 min.  That record stood for nearly two years.  Other drivers in both years included Bert Holcomb (who was in charge of the runs), Lawrence Duffie (Demonstrator of the Gasoline Dept of Electric Vehicle Company, which manufactured Columbia cars), and Harry Sandol.  In 1903, the fifth driver was David R. Adams; in 1904 it was Eddie Bald.

Racing career
Nicknamed the "Little Professor" for his pioneering work of creating, with Howard Marmon, the Marmon Wasp, which was a revolutionary design being the first open-wheel single-seater racecar. Harroun is best known for winning the first running of the Indianapolis 500 Mile Race on May 30, 1911. He is known to have started at least 60 AAA-sanctioned races, during the years 1905–1911 (statistics on some of the shorter races document only the top three finishers, so some starts resulting in lower finishes may not be known).  From 1909 to 1911, Harroun drove primarily for the team operated by Indianapolis-based auto maker, Marmon.  However, at least one 1909 race result shows him driving a Buick.  Also, statistics from 1905 through 1908 show him driving cars described as "Harroun Custom" and "Harroun Sneezer."

Race wins
.
Harroun's race wins included: a 1910 100-mile race at the Atlanta Motordrome; the 1910 200-mile Wheeler-Schebler Trophy Race (at the Indianapolis Motor Speedway); the May 1910, 50-mile Remy Grand Brassard Race (also at IMS); three races at Churchill Downs (home of the Kentucky Derby); three races at the original Latonia Race Track; and races at tracks in New Orleans, Los Angeles, Long Island and Memphis.  He is best known for winning the first Indianapolis 500, driving a Marmon.

Harroun won a total of 8 races at the Indianapolis Motor Speedway, the second-most of any driver in the 100-year history of the track (the only driver with more victories at IMS is Johnny Aitken, with 15 wins in 1909–1916).

Retroactive champion designation
During the years that Harroun was driving, the AAA designated some races each year as "championship" events.  However, there was no actual year-long championship, and no points were awarded.  In 1927, points were assigned retroactively, and champions were designated for those years.  At that time, Harroun was designated the champion for the 1910 season.

The first Indianapolis 500
At the first Indianapolis 500 in 1911, his use of what would now be called a rear-view mirror, rather than the riding mechanic specified in the rules, created controversy, but was ultimately allowed. Harroun, who came out of retirement to race in the first 500, would not race after 1911. Harroun's historic Firestone-shod yellow #32 Marmon "Wasp," in which he won the Indianapolis 500, is on display at the Indianapolis Motor Speedway Hall of Fame Museum.

The 50th Anniversary race in 1961 was won by A. J. Foyt, and both Harroun and Foyt appeared together on the television program I've Got a Secret—their secret being their respective wins at Indianapolis.

Later career
After retiring from racing, Harroun continued engineering work for Marmon, and later for the Maxwell racing team.

In 1916, Harroun started his own automobile company in Wayne, Michigan, called the Harroun Motor Car Company. The venture folded after World War I, and today a street in Wayne is named for him.

In 1927 he joined Lincoln Products.

He continued to work in the automotive industry until his retirement at age 89. He died on January 19, 1968.

Indianapolis 500 results

Legacy
He was inducted in the Indianapolis Motor Speedway Hall of Fame in 1952 and the Motorsports Hall of Fame of America in 2000.

References

External links

 
 Ray Harroun discussed in interview with his son Dick Harroun - on RaceRewind.com
 
 Columbia Car webpages
 The Greatest 33

1879 births
1968 deaths
People from Spartansburg, Pennsylvania
American founders of automobile manufacturers
Racing drivers from Pennsylvania
Indianapolis 500 drivers
Indianapolis 500 winners
American automotive engineers
Automotive businesspeople